Spathilepia is a butterfly genus in the family Hesperiidae (Eudaminae). The genus is monotypic containing the single species Spathilepia clonius found in Texas, Central America and Colombia to Brazil and Argentina. They are native to Mexico but have been found all over Latin Americawith them originating in Mexico and having spread to some parts of southern Texas.

References 

Natural History Museum Lepidoptera genus database

External links
Images representing Spathilepia at Consortium for the Barcode of Life
Falcate skipper Spathilepia Clonius (Cramer, 1775). (2017, July 15). Retrieved October 28, 2022, from https://www.butterfliesandmoths.org/species/Spathilepia-clonius

Hesperiidae
Butterflies of North America
Butterflies of Central America
Hesperiidae of South America
Fauna of the Amazon
Monotypic butterfly genera
Taxa named by Arthur Gardiner Butler
Hesperiidae genera